The Australian Government Department of Agriculture was a federal government department charged with the responsibility to develop and implement policies and programs that ensure Australia's agricultural, fisheries, food and forestry industries remain competitive, profitable and sustainable.

The head of the department was the Secretary of the Department of Agriculture, initially Paul Grimes (until March 2015) and then Daryl Quinlivan. The Secretary was responsible to the Minister for Agriculture, the Hon. Barnaby Joyce .

Overview
Department of Agriculture policies and programs:
 encourage and support sustainable natural resource use and management 
 protect the health and safety of plant and animal industries 
 enable industries to adapt to compete in a fast-changing international and economic environment
 help improve market access and market performance for the agricultural and food sector 
 encourage and assist industries to adopt new technology and practices 
 assist primary producers and the food industry to develop business and marketing skills, and to be financially self-reliant.

History
The department was formed by way of an administrative order issued on 18 September 2013 and replaced the functions previously performed by the Department of Agriculture, Fisheries and Forestry.

Preceding departments
Department of Markets and Migration (16 January 1925 – 19 January 1928)
Department of Markets (19 January 1928 – 10 December 1928)
Department of Markets and Transport (10 December 1928 – 21 April 1930)
Department of Markets (21 April 1930 – 13 April 1932)
Department of Commerce (13 April 1932 – 22 December 1942)
Department of Commerce and Agriculture (22 December 1942 – 11 January 1956)
Department of Primary Industry (11 January 1956 – 2 June 1974)
Department of Agriculture (12 June 1974 – 22 December 1975)
Department of Primary Industry (22 December 1975 – 24 July 1987)
Department of Primary Industries and Energy (24 July 1987 – 21 October 1998)
Department of Agriculture, Fisheries and Forestry (21 October 1998 – 18 September 2013)

Subsequent departments

Department of Agriculture and Water Resources (21 September 2015 – 29 May 2019)

Operational activities

The department facilitated the development of self-reliant, profitable, competitive and sustainable Australian farm businesses and industries. Through consultation with industry, the department develops and implements policies and programs that help to assure product safety and integrity. Particular emphasis is placed on on-farm risk management that relates to food safety.

References

Ministries established in 2013
Agriculture
2013 establishments in Australia
2015 disestablishments in Australia
Department of Agriculture, Fisheries and Forestry